Michael Norman George James (born 1940)  is Emeritus Distinguished Professor of Biochemistry at the University of Alberta. He was elected a Fellow of the Royal Society (FRS) in  1989 for "substantial contributions to the improvement of natural knowledge".

References

Living people
Alumni of Linacre College, Oxford
Fellows of the Royal Society of Canada
1940 births
Canadian Fellows of the Royal Society
University of Manitoba alumni
Academic staff of the University of Alberta
Canadian biochemists